Just What Time It Is is the second album by American-born singer/songwriter Jeb Loy Nichols, released in 2000 on the Rough Trade record label.

Track listing
All songs written by Jeb Loy Nichols except as indicated.

"Heaven Right Here" – 3:38
"Perfect Stranger" – 4:16
"Hold Me Till I Fall" (Nichols, Wayne Nunes) – 3"23
"Kissing Gate" (Nichols, Nunes) – 3:32
"Say Goodbye to Christopher" (Nichols, Ewan Pearson) – 4:01
"Room 522" (Nichols, Nunes) – 3:38
"She Reminded Me" – 2:57
"Midnight (All Night Long)" – 3:55
"Summer Came" – 4:17
"Trying to Get Over" (Nichols, Nunes) – 3:48
"Sadly Sometimes" (Nichols, Lorraine Morley) – 4:12
"Double Dose of You" – 3:18
"Heavy Changes" – 5:40

Reception

Nichols' second release received good reviews. Allmusic.com said "He has soul oozing out of every pore." They add "And on top of it all, the songs are great." KEXP.org, the radio station of the Experience Music Project said "Deceptively light, it gets deeper with every listen."

References

2000 albums
Jeb Loy Nichols albums
Rough Trade Records albums